Curtis Jackson (born September 22, 1973 in Fort Worth, Texas) is a former gridiron football player. In 1999, he played in nine regular-season games for the Hamilton Tiger-Cats of the Canadian Football League before being cut from the team. Jackson played with the New England Patriots in 2002, and was a part of their Super Bowl XXXVI championship season. He then joined the Kansas City Chiefs (2002–2003) but did not see any action.  In 2004, he returned to the CFL and played in 11 games for the Ottawa Renegades.

References

External links
Pro-Football reference

1973 births
Living people
Players of American football from Fort Worth, Texas
Texas Longhorns football players
New England Patriots players
Kansas City Chiefs players